Zachary Taylor Davis (May 26, 1869 – December 16, 1946) was the architect of several major Chicago buildings, including St. Ambrose (1904) Comiskey Park (1910), Wrigley Field (1914), Mount Carmel High School (1924), and St. James Chapel of Archbishop Quigley Preparatory Seminary (1918).

Biography
Davis was born in Aurora, Illinois, and graduated from the Chicago School of Architecture at Armour Institute (later Illinois Institute of Technology). After graduating he began a six-year apprenticeship, part of which was spent as a draftsman for Louis Sullivan—along with another aspiring architect, Frank Lloyd Wright. After his work with Adler and Sullivan, Davis began his career as supervising architect for Armour & Company. Later, in 1900, Davis started an independent firm with his brother Charles.

In 1909, he designed the third Kankakee County Courthouse. A year later, he was hired by Charles Comiskey to design White Sox Park, later known as Comiskey Park. To prepare for the project, Davis toured ballparks around the country with White Sox pitcher Ed Walsh. In 1914, he was hired by the Chicago Whales to design Weeghman Park, which would later become Wrigley Field. Davis was also involved with the design of the original Yankee Stadium.

For most of his career, Davis worked out of his offices in the Unity Building in Chicago's Loop. He lived quietly with his family at his home at 45th and Drexel in Kenwood, Chicago. One architectural historian called Davis "one of the most significant lost architects in Chicago." He died at Mercy Hospital in Chicago on December 16, 1946, aged 74, and was buried at Mount Olivet Cemetery.

Davis and his wife, Alma C. Davis, had their first child in 1898. Zachary Taylor Davis II worked as a salesman for Monsanto Company and died of a heart attack on August 11, 1938, at his home in Evanston, Illinois, survived by his wife, Mary (née Ryan) and seven-year-old son, Zachary Taylor Davis III.

Davis and Alma also had two other sons, David and Lawrence, and a daughter, Mary Louise, who married Charles Allison.

Alma died on November 13, 1946, a month before Davis himself.

Ballparks

Known as the "Frank Lloyd Wright of baseball", Davis was one of the first architects to design ballparks with innovative steel-beam and concrete construction. Before his design of Comiskey Park, Chicago ballparks were wooden structures with minimal capital investment.  This allowed both Chicago teams to move frequently and also meant that demolition of the old parks was inexpensive.  Davis's designs and their more solid construction ended this trend in Chicago.

When Comiskey Park needed to be expanded, in part to accommodate fans of the visiting Babe Ruth, Davis oversaw the renovations. He also oversaw the expansion of Wrigley Field in 1922.

In 1925, Wrigley Field (Los Angeles) opened, also designed by Davis. With Davis commissioned by Chicago Cubs owner Philip K. Wrigley, the Los Angeles ballpark was patterned after Wrigley Field in Chicago and was initially home to the Los Angeles Angels, a minor league affiliate of the Chicago Cubs.

Notes

External links
Zachary Taylor Davis
Friends of the Windows at St. James Chapel

People from Aurora, Illinois
Architects from Chicago
1872 births
1946 deaths
Illinois Institute of Technology alumni
Architects of Roman Catholic churches
Sports venue architects